Youth on Trial is a 1945 American crime drama film noir mystery film directed by Budd Boetticher (as Oscar Boetticher Jr.) and starring Cora Sue Collins, David Reed, Eric Sinclair, Georgia Bayes and Robert B. Williams.

Plot
A female juvenile court judge learns that her own daughter is one of the town delinquents in this minor low-budget potboiler.

Cast
 Cora Sue Collins as Cam Chandler
 David Reed as Tom Lowry
 Eric Sinclair as Denny Moore
 Georgia Bayes as Meg Chandler
 Robert B. Williams as Officer Ken Moore (as Robert Williams)
 Mary Currier as Judge Julia Chandler
 John Calvert as Jud Lowry

See also
 List of American films of 1945

References

External links

Youth on Trial at TCMDB

1945 films
American drama films
1940s English-language films
1945 drama films
American black-and-white films
Films directed by Budd Boetticher
1940s American films